Léguillac-de-l'Auche is a commune in the Dordogne department in Nouvelle-Aquitaine in southwestern France.

Population

Landmarks
 Castle du But, a 15th and 16th centuries, listed historic monument of the French Ministry of Culture.
 Château de Faye, former Priory, 
 The Feudal era Motte of the Redoubte
 the 19th-century Romanesque Church of Saint-Cloud, 
 Ruins of the Priory Church Sainte-Marie de La Faye, 13th century.

See also
Communes of the Dordogne department

References

Communes of Dordogne